Dolgoye is a rural locality and the administrative center of Klyukvinsky Selsoviet Rural Settlement, Kursky District, Kursk Oblast, Russia. Population:

Geography 
The village is located in the Seym River basin (a left tributary of the Desna), 100 km from the Russia–Ukraine border, 7 km east of the district center – the town Kursk.

 Streets
There are the following streets in the locality: Beryozovaya, Lazurnaya, Lipovaya, Lugovaya, Mirnaya, Novaya, Raduzhnaya, Sadovaya, Svetlaya, Solnechnaya and Tikhaya (225 houses).

 Climate
Dolgoye has a warm-summer humid continental climate (Dfb in the Köppen climate classification).

Transport 
Dolgoye is located on the federal route  (Kursk – Voronezh –  "Kaspy" Highway; a part of the European route ), on the road of intermunicipal significance  (Postoyalye Dvory – Dolgoye), 5 km from the nearest railway station Klyukva (railway line Klyukva — Belgorod).

The rural locality is situated 6 km from Kursk Vostochny Airport, 119 km from Belgorod International Airport and 200 km from Voronezh Peter the Great Airport.

References

Notes

Sources

Rural localities in Kursky District, Kursk Oblast